New Pranks of Andersson's Kalle (Swedish: Anderssonskans Kalle på nya upptåg) is a 1923 silent comedy film directed by Sigurd Wallén and starring Gösta Alexandersson, Dagmar Ebbesen and Edvin Adolphson. It is a sequel to the 1922 film Andersson's Kalle which was based on the 1901 novel of the same title by Emil Norlander.

Synopsis
Kalle a young boy from the working class Södermalm district of Stockholm is adopted by a wealthy family and introduced into the high society of the city. However, he remains fond of practical jokes.

Cast
 Gösta Alexandersson as 	Kalle
 Anna Diedrich as 	Anderssonsskan
 Dagmar Ebbesen as Pilgrenskan
 Albin Lindahl as Graham
 Hilda Castegren as Clövercrona
 Mona Mårtenson as Ruth Graha, direktørns syster
 Edvin Adolphson as Paul Abraham Ceder
 Julia Cæsar as 	Lövbergskan
 Hildur Skantze as 	Mrs. Graham
 Carl-Gunnar Wingård as 	Mogren

References

Bibliography
 Qvist, Per Olov & von Bagh, Peter. Guide to the Cinema of Sweden and Finland. Greenwood Publishing Group, 2000.

External links

1923 films
1923 comedy films
Swedish comedy films
Swedish silent feature films
Swedish black-and-white films
Films directed by Sigurd Wallén
1920s Swedish-language films
Films based on Swedish novels
Films set in Stockholm
Swedish sequel films
Silent comedy films
1920s Swedish films